Langweid am Lech is a municipality and a village in the district of Augsburg in Bavaria, Germany.

The municipality is located on the river Lech, 9 miles north of Augsburg.

References

Augsburg (district)
Villages in Bavaria